Bryanston is the name of several places around the world:

 Bryanston, Dorset, England
 Bryanston School, Dorset, England
 Bryanston, Gauteng, part of Sandton, South Africa
 Bryanston, Ontario, Canada, a hamlet within Middlesex Centre

Bryanston is also an English surname. People with the surname include:

 Claudette Bryanston, English theatre director

Films
 Bryanston Films (UK)
 Bryanston Films